Clwyd West is a constituency of the House of Commons of the Parliament of the United Kingdom (at Westminster). It elects one Member of Parliament (MP) by the first past the post method of election. The current MP is David Jones of the Conservative Party, first elected at the 2005 general election and who also served as Secretary of State for Wales from 4 September 2012 until 14 July 2014.

Boundaries

Following the Fifth Periodic Review of Westminster constituencies, as confirmed by The Parliamentary Constituencies and Assembly Electoral Regions (Wales) Order 2006, the constituency of Clwyd West is formed from the following electoral wards:

In Conwy County Borough: Abergele Pensarn,  Betws yn Rhos, Colwyn, Eirias, Gele, Glyn, Kinmel Bay, Llanddulas, Llandrillo yn Rhos, Llanfair Talhaiarn, Llangernyw, Llansannan, Llysfaen, Mochdre, Towyn
In Denbighshire County: Efenechtyd, Llanarmon-yn-Ial/Llandegla, Llanbedr Dyffryn Clwyd/Llangynhafal, Llanfair Dyffryn Clwyd/Gwyddelwern, Llanrhaeadr-yng-Nghinmeirch, Ruthin.

History
The constituency was created in 1997 from parts of the seats of Clwyd South West and Clwyd North West. In the 2005 election this constituency was the Conservative Party's twentieth target.  The area has generally voted for Conservative candidates, though it was won by Labour in their 1997 and 2001 landslides.

Members of Parliament

Elections

Elections in the 1990s

Elections in the 2000s

Of the 57 rejected ballots:
27 were either unmarked or it was uncertain who the vote was for.
26 voted for more than one candidate.
4 had writing or mark by which the voter could be identified.

Elections in the 2010s

Of the 67 rejected ballots:
52 were either unmarked or it was uncertain who the vote was for.
15 voted for more than one candidate.

Of the 76 rejected ballots:
54 were either unmarked or it was uncertain who the vote was for.
22 voted for more than one candidate.

 

Of the 79 rejected ballots:
62 were either unmarked or it was uncertain who the vote was for.
15 voted for more than one candidate.
2 had want of official mark.

 

Of the 147 rejected ballots:
134 were either unmarked or it was uncertain who the vote was for.
13 voted for more than one candidate.

See also 
 Clwyd West (Senedd constituency)
 List of parliamentary constituencies in Clwyd
 List of parliamentary constituencies in Wales

References

External links
Official declaration of result of the poll (2005) (in PDF)
Politics Resources (Election results from 1922 onwards)
Electoral Calculus (Election results from 1955 onwards)
2017 Election House Of Commons Library 2017 Election report
A Vision Of Britain Through Time (Constituency elector numbers)

Parliamentary constituencies in North Wales
Constituencies of the Parliament of the United Kingdom established in 1997